So Dark the Con of Man is the second album by the Norwegian urban music duo Madcon, released in December 2007. Its title is an anagram used in The Da Vinci Code, a 2003 novel by Dan Brown.

Track listing

Charts

Weekly charts

Year-end charts

Certifications

Release history

References

2007 albums
Madcon albums